The Wag-Aero CHUBy CUBy is a high-wing four-seat homebuilt cabin monoplane of tube-and-fabric construction, it is a modern representation of the  Piper PA-14 taildragger with elements from other Piper family members. The plane is currently marketed as the Wag-Aero Sportsman 2+2 by Wag-Aero in kit form.

Design and development
The CHUBy CUBy was the third homebuilt replica of a Piper product from parts supplier Wag-Aero. The PA-14 line was a popular aircraft for Alaska floatplane operations, the CHUBy CUBy was put to market to allow new examples to be built. The aircraft has an optional large opening to the baggage compartment similar to the Piper HE-1 ambulance style door.

The CHUBy CUBy closely resembles the Piper PA-14, but has several modifications. The CHUBy CUBy has swing-up doors on both sides of the cabin and two wing-mounted fuel tanks with a small header tank. The fuselage is welded from 4130 steel tubing rather than 1020 grade steel used in the original. The wings include spoilers to keep the aircraft on the ground and avoid floating.

Wag-Aero company president Dick Wagner flew the CHUBy CUBy for the first time on May 8, 1982.

Specifications CHUBy  CUBy

References

External links

Wag-Aero aircraft
Homebuilt aircraft
1980s United States civil utility aircraft
High-wing aircraft
Single-engined tractor aircraft
Aircraft first flown in 1982